The 2018 All-Ireland Senior Hurling Championship was the 131st staging of the All-Ireland Senior Hurling Championship since its establishment by the Gaelic Athletic Association in 1887. It is the first tier of senior inter-county championship hurling.

The championship began on 12 May 2018 and ended on 19 August 2018. The draw for the championship round-robin fixtures was held off camera on 19 October 2017 and announced on the championship draw broadcast on RTÉ2.

The Championship was won by Limerick, who were crowned champions after overcoming Galway in the final by a score line of 3–16 to 2-18. Limerick's victory was their eighth All-Ireland title and first since 1973.

The 2018 Championship has been described by many as one of the best ever.	
		
The 2018 championship saw the biggest change in format since the introduction of the qualifiers in 2002.

New format
A new provincial hurling championship featuring five-team round-robin groups in both Leinster and Munster and the new Joe McDonagh Cup was introduced in 2018 for an initial three-year period. The proposal was carried by a narrow margin with 62% voting in favour (a majority of at least 60% was required) at the GAA's Special Congress on 30 September 2017. The top two teams in each provincial group would contest the provincial final, with the provincial winners advancing to the All-Ireland semi-finals and the losing provincial finalists advancing to the two quarter-finals.	

An amendment to the motion from Laois, Offaly and Meath was carried by 87%. The third-placed teams in Leinster and Munster would compete in All-Ireland preliminary quarter-finals against the two Joe McDonagh Cup finalists, with the Joe McDonagh Cup teams having home advantage.

If a non-Munster team were to win the Joe McDonagh Cup, the bottom team in the Leinster championship would be relegated to the following year's Joe McDonagh Cup and would be replaced in the following year's Leinster championship by the Joe McDonagh Cup winners. If a Munster team were to win the Joe McDonagh Cup, they would play off against the team who finished bottom in the Munster championship for the right to play in the following year's Munster championship, thereby ensuring that only Munster teams compete in the Munster championship.

The restructure of hurling involved the reduction of the Leinster championship from nine teams to five while the Munster championship continued with the previous five Munster teams (Kerry previously competed in the qualifier group of the Leinster championship). A six-team Joe McDonagh Cup was created, consisting of all four teams from the 2017 Leinster qualifier group plus Antrim and Carlow, the 2017 Christy Ring Cup finalists.

Teams
A total of twelve teams competed in the championship – five in the Leinster championship, five in the Munster championship, and the top two teams from the Joe McDonagh Cup who entered at the preliminary quarter-final stage.

Teams and venues
Each team has a nominal home stadium for the round-robin series of the provincial championships. However, Waterford will not play their "home" games at Walsh Park, instead playing in neutral venues for these fixtures, namely Limerick's Gaelic Grounds and Semple Stadium in Thurles.

In the knockout stage, teams from the provincial round-robin series will not have home advantage, if avoidable. The only teams to play knockout games at home are the two Joe McDonagh Cup finalists, who had home advantage in the preliminary quarter-finals. The Munster final was held at a neutral venue which was decided based on the qualifying teams, while the locations of the two quarter-finals were decided based on similar considerations. The Leinster final, and the semi-finals and final of the All-Ireland series are held in the 82,300-capacity Croke Park in Dublin, headquarters of the GAA.

Personnel and colours

Summary

Championships

Provincial championships

Leinster Senior Hurling Championship

{| class="wikitable" style="text-align:center"
!width=20|
!width=150 style="text-align:left;"|Team
!width=20|
!width=20|
!width=20|
!width=20|
!width=30|
!width=30|
!width=20|
!width=20|
!Qualification
|- style="background:#ccffcc"
|1||align=left| Galway ||4||4||0||0||7-89 (110)||6-62 (80)||+30||8
| rowspan="2" |Advance to Leinster Final
|- style="background:#ccffcc" 
|2||align=left| Kilkenny ||4||3||0||1||5-76 (91)||6-69 (87)||+4||6
|- style="background:#FFFFE0" 
|3||align=left| Wexford ||4||2||0||2||6-81 (99)||5-68 (83)||+16||4 
|Advance to All-Ireland Preliminary Quarter-Finals
|-
|4||align=left| Dublin ||4||1||0||3||9-73 (100) ||1-85 (88)||+12||2
|
|- style="background:#ffcccc"   
|5||align=left| Offaly ||4||0||0||4||5-50 (65)||14-85 (127)||–62||0
|Relegated to Joe McDonagh Cup
|}

Munster Senior Hurling Championship

{| class="wikitable" style="text-align:center"
!width=20|
!width=150 style="text-align:left;"|Team
!width=20|
!width=20|
!width=20|
!width=20|
!width=30|
!width=30|
!width=20|
!width=20|
!Qualification
|- style="background:#ccffcc"
|1||align=left| Cork ||4||2||2||0||5-94 (109)||4-89 (101)||+8||6
| rowspan="2" |Advance to Munster Final
|- style="background:#ccffcc" 
|2||align=left| Clare ||4||3||0||1||4-97 (109)||5-77 (92)||+17||6
|-style="background:#FFFFE0"
|3||align=left| Limerick ||4||2||1||1||3-92 (101)||4-81 (93)||+8||5
|Advance to All-Ireland Preliminary Quarter-Finals
|- 
|4||align=left| Tipperary ||4||0||2||2||7-77 (98)||5-91 (106)||–8||2
| rowspan="2" |
|-   
|5||align=left| Waterford ||4||0||1||3||6-76 (94)||7-98 (119)||–25||1
|}

Joe McDonagh Cup

The inaugural Joe McDonagh Cup, the second tier of senior inter-county championship hurling, was contested by Antrim, Carlow, Kerry, Laois, Meath and Westmeath. Each team played all the other teams once in a round-robin format, with the top two teams progressing to the Joe McDonagh Cup final and also advancing to the All-Ireland preliminary quarter-finals, where they played the teams that finished third in the Leinster and Munster championships. Westmeath confirmed their place in the Joe McDonagh Cup final on 2 June 2018 after winning their first four matches, with Carlow confirming their place on 9 June after beating Westmeath.

{| class="wikitable" style="text-align:center"
!width=20|
!width=150 style="text-align:left;"|Team
!width=20|
!width=20|
!width=20|
!width=20|
!width=30|
!width=50|
!width=20|
!width=20|
|- style="background:#ccffcc"
|1||align=left| Carlow (Q)||5||4||0||1||122||102||20||8
|- style="background:#ccffcc"
|2||align=left| Westmeath (Q)||5||4||0||1||130||115||15||8
|- 
|3||align=left| Kerry ||5||3||0||2||105||97||8||6
|-
|4||align=left| Laois ||5||2||0||3||118||123||-5||4
|- style="background:#ffdfdf"  
|5||align=left| Antrim ||5||2||0||3||130||116||14||4
|- style="background:#ffcccc"  
|6||align=left| Meath ||5||0||0||5||94||146||-52||0
|}

Final
The top two teams at the end of the round-robin, Westmeath and Carlow, faced each other in the final on 1 July 2018. The game, which took place in Croke Park, saw Carlow emerge victorious by a margin of five points to claim the inaugural Joe McDonagh Cup title.

As a Leinster county, Carlow were automatically promoted to the Leinster championship for 2019, taking the place of Offaly.

All-Ireland Senior Hurling Championship

Bracket

All-Ireland preliminary quarter-finals
The preliminary quarter-finals saw the third-placed teams from the two provincial round-robins play the two teams who competed in the Joe McDonagh Cup Final, with the two finalists having home advantage. Joe McDonagh champions Carlow faced third-placed Munster team Limerick in Dr Cullen Park, while runners-up Westmeath met Wexford, the third-place finished from Leinster, in Mullingar's Cusack Park.

All-Ireland quarter-finals
The two quarter-finals saw the losing provincial finalists play the winners of the two preliminary quarter-finals. As both third-place finishers from the provincial series won in the previous round, they were kept apart from the teams they had already met in the round-robin phase to prevent a repeat fixture. Munster runners-up Clare met Wexford, with beaten Leinster finalists Kilkenny facing Limerick the following day. Both games were held at neutral venues.

All-Ireland semi-finals
The semi-finals took place in Croke Park across the last weekend of July, with the Leinster (Galway) and Munster champions (Cork) playing the winners of the two quarter-finals — Clare and Limerick respectively.

All-Ireland final

Championship statistics

Top scorers overall

Top scorers in a single game

Scoring Events
Widest winning margin: 24 points
 Offaly 2-9 – 5-24 Wexford (Leinster round-robin)
 Carlow 0-13 – 5-22 Limerick (All-Ireland preliminary quarter-final)
Most goals in a match: 7
 Offaly 2-9 – 5-24 Wexford (Leinster round-robin)
 Offaly 2-15 – 5-18 Galway (Leinster round-robin)
Most points in a match: 63
Cork 2-31 – 3-32 Limerick (All-Ireland semi-final, after extra time)
Most goals by one team in a match: 5
 Offaly 2-9 – 5-24 Wexford (Leinster round-robin)
 Offaly 2-15 – 5-18 Galway (Leinster round-robin)
 Carlow 0-13 – 5-22 Limerick (All-Ireland preliminary quarter-final)
Most goals by a losing team: 3
 Dublin 3-16 – 1-24 Kilkenny (Leinster round-robin)
Cork 2-24 – 3-19 Clare (Munster final)
Kilkenny 3-15 – 1-28 Galway (Leinster final, replay)
 Highest aggregate score: 78 points (new all-time record)
Cork 2-31 – 3-32 Limerick (All-Ireland semi-final, after extra time)
Lowest aggregate score: 36 points
Kilkenny 0-18 – 0-18 Galway (Leinster final, drawn match)

Miscellaneous

 The Munster round-robin game between Clare and Waterford was the first Munster Championship game to take place at Cusack Park in Ennis since 1997.	
 The Leinster round-robin game between Galway and Kilkenny at Pearse Stadium in Salthill was Galway's first home Leinster Championship match. It was the first provincial championship game (excluding the Connacht championship) to take place in County Galway since 1965.	
Clare's defeat of Tipperary in the Munster round-robin game was their first victory over the team since 2003. It is also their first defeat of Tipperary in Thurles since 1928.	
Michael "Brick" Walsh of Waterford set a new record when he made his 74th championship appearance against Cork on 17 June 2018.
Cork won back-to-back Munster titles for the first time since 2005/06.
The Leinster final ended in a draw for the first time since 1993.	
The Leinster final was played outside Leinster for the first time.
 For only the second year in a row, no county from Leinster reached the All-Ireland semi-final stage, with the four spots going to Clare, Cork, Galway and Limerick. (Galway currently play in the Leinster Championship but are geographically in Connacht.)
 Limerick defeated Kilkenny in the championship for the first time since 1973.
 Kilkenny failed to win the All-Ireland for the third consecutive year. This is their longest titleless streak since 1994–1999, when they went six years without an All-Ireland.
 Limerick achieve victory in the All-Ireland final for the first time since 1973.
 Limerick defeated Galway in the All-Ireland final for the very first time.

Live Hurling on TV

RTÉ, the national broadcaster in Ireland, provided the majority of the live television coverage of the hurling championship in the second year of a five-year deal running from 2017 until 2021. Sky Sports also broadcast a number of matches and had exclusive rights to some games.

Awards
Sunday Game Team of the Year
The Sunday Game team of the year was picked on 19 August, which was the night of the final.	
The panel consisting of Brendan Cummins, Jackie Tyrrell, Anthony Daly, Eddie Brennan, Dónal O'Grady, Ken McGrath and Cyril Farrell unanimously selected Galway's Pádraic Mannion as the Sunday game player of the year.	
	
 1. Eoin Murphy (Kilkenny)
 2. Sean Finn (Limerick)
 3. Daithi Burke (Galway)
 4. Richie English (Limerick)
 5. Diarmaid Byrnes (Limerick)
 6. Declan Hannon (Limerick)
 7. Padraic Mannion (Galway)
 8. Darragh Fitzgibbon (Cork)
 9. Cian Lynch (Limerick)
 10. Peter Duggan (Clare)
 11. Joe Canning (Galway)
 12. Tom Morrissey (Limerick)
 13. Graeme Mulcahy (Limerick)
 14. John Conlon (Clare)
 15. Seamus Harnedy (Cork)

All Star Team of the Year
On 2 November, the 2018 PwC All-Stars winners were announced and presented at Dublin's Convention Centre. Cian Lynch was named as the All Stars Hurler of the Year with Kyle Hayes named the All Stars Young Hurler of the Year.

Footnotes

References

 
2018 in hurling